Identitas is a 2009 Indonesian drama film directed by Aria Kusumadewa. The film won four awards at the Indonesian Film Festival in 2010, including Best Film.

Accolades

References 

Citra Award winners
2000s Indonesian-language films
2009 films
2009 drama films
Indonesian drama films